A bus monitor, bus attendant or bus assistant is someone who assumes responsibility for the safety of children on a school bus. Specific tasks may include:

 Helping to load students onto the bus
 Ensuring students are well behaved
 Assisting the driver
 Conducting safety drills

A bus monitor can also be responsible for people with special needs.  These tasks can include but are not limited to:

 Loading and unloading wheelchairs
 Putting proper safety equipment on riders
 Knowledge of their special needs passengers
 Ability to stay calm during an emergency

Bus monitors are also subjected to meetings and different types of training for the job.  The training is for ensuring their knowledge is up to date with safety and others kinds of procedures.  It is the bus monitor's responsibility to make sure their passengers make it to their destination safely.  They are also responsible of knowing the general area of where their stops are and the laws and regulations there.

See also

 Bus conductor
 Bus driver
 Bus monitor bullying video

References

Transport occupations
Bus terminology